Hiashatar is a medieval chess variant played in Mongolia. The game is played on a 10×10 board. The pieces are the same as in chess with the exception that there is an additional piece which is called the "bodyguard". The starting position is similar to chess, except that a bodyguard each is placed between king and bishop and between queen and bishop with a pawn in front and there are two more rows in the middle. The game is not as popular as western chess or Shatar.

Pieces 
 King (noyon) - moves like the King in chess
 Queen (bers) - moves like the Queen in chess
 Bodyguard (hia) - moves like a Queen, but can only move one or two squares. The Bodyguard has a special power; any piece sliding must stop its move if it moves through any square a king's move away from the bodyguard.  Any piece a king's move away from the bodyguard can only move one square.  The only piece immune to this power of the Bodyguard is the Knight.
 Rook (tereg) - moves like the rook in chess
 Knight (mori) - moves like the Knight in chess
 Bishop (temē) - moves like the Bishop in chess
 Pawn (hū) - moves like the pawn in chess except that it can make an initial triple step.

Other Rules 
 There is no castling
 Pawns promote only to queen

References
 N. Okano, Sekai-no meina shogi (World's chess games), p. 40-46, chapter V. 1999.

Games related to chaturanga
Mongolian games
Chess variants
Chess in Mongolia